CLOC (an acronym derived from CoLOCation) was a first generation general purpose text analyzer program. It was produced at the University of Birmingham and could produce concordances as well as word lists and collocational analysis of text. First-generation concordancers were typically held on a mainframe computer and used at a single site; individual research teams would build their own concordancer and use it on the data they had access to locally, any further analysis was done by separate programs.

History
CLOC was written by Alan Reed in Algol 68-R which was available only on the ICT 1900 series of computer at that time. Perhaps because it was designed for use in a department of linguistics rather than by computer specialists it had the distinction of having a comparatively simple user interface, it also has some useful features for studying collations or the co-occurrence of words.

CLOC was used in the COBUILD project that was headed by Professor John Sinclair.

Further reading

References

History of software